William Edward Carter (28 February 1900 – 24 August 1969), known as Ted Carter, was a publican and member of the Queensland Legislative Assembly.

Biography
Carter was born in 1900 in Mount Morgan, Queensland, to parents Joseph Frederick Carter and his wife Clara Jane (née Vickers). He attended state schools in Mount Morgan and Red Hill and, from 1916 until he entered politics, he worked for Queensland Rail. Carter married Margaret McNae on 9 March 1927.

Carter won the state seat of Fitzroy in 1929 for the CPNP. He did not contest the seat in the 1932 Queensland state election.

After his retirement from politics, Carter managed a hotel in Sydney from 1941 until 1967. He died in Rosalie, Queensland in 1969 and was buried at Pinnaroo Lawn Cemetery, Brisbane.

References

Members of the Queensland Legislative Assembly
1900 births
1969 deaths
Burials at Pinnaroo Cemetery, Brisbane
20th-century Australian politicians